The 2004 Bahrain Super Prix was the inaugural and only Bahrain Super Prix race held at the Bahrain International Circuit on December 10, 2004. It was won by Briton Lewis Hamilton for Manor Motorsport, who finished ahead of Nico Rosberg and Jamie Green.

Drivers and teams

Classification

Qualifying 
Qualifying was split into two sessions, both of 45 minutes, with the best times of each driver counting towards the grid for the qualifying race.

Qualifying race

Race

See also
 Bahrain Super Prix

References

Bahrain Super Prix
Bahrain Super Prix
Bahrain Super Prix